Crazy Over Daisy is a Donald Duck animated short film which was originally released on March 18, 1950. Produced by  Technicolor by Walt Disney Productions and RKO Radio Pictures, the short featured Donald Duck, Daisy Duck and Chip n' Dale. Mickey Mouse, Minnie Mouse and Goofy also made a brief cameo at the beginning of the movie. The story takes place in the 1890s. Donald is on his way to visit Daisy, when Chip n' Dale come along and spoil the date.

Plot
In the 1890s, Donald Duck is riding his penny-farthing bicycle, humming a love tune (which was the theme song "Crazy Over Daisy") and on his way to Daisy Duck, he went past Mickey Mouse and Minnie Mouse and Goofy, however Chip n' Dale seen to be come along and made fun of Donald, which caused Donald's mood went down and a small war begun and his bicycle was destroyed in the process.

Donald then irritably grabbed the two chipmunks and rushed back home till the scamps are caught and put to fitting hard-labour, powering a modified bicycle's wheels like hamsters in a wheel which that creating a new penny-farthing bicycle, but Chip n' Dale providing the power to make the bike move, which makes Donald happy and whistling again as he continues to Daisy's house.

Once at Daisy's, Daisy was appalled at Donald's behaviour and became enraged at Donald "being cruel" to two innocent chipmunks, called Donald a villain with cruelty to animals and went back into her house with the chipmunks. Donald then angrily protested, threw off his hat and stormed off down the street as the cartoon closes.

Voice cast
 Donald Duck: Clarence Nash
 Daisy Duck: Gloria Blondell
 Chip: Helen Silbert
 Dale: Dessie Miller

Song
The short introduced Daisy's theme song "Daisy Mae," and in later appearances, Donald can be heard whistling or quacking the tune, such as in  Dude Duck, Out on a Limb and Chips Ahoy. The music was also reused for the song "Meet Me Down on Main Street" recorded by the Mellomen.

Lyrics

Home media
The short was released on December 11, 2007, on Walt Disney Treasures: The Chronological Donald, Volume Three: 1947-1950.

References

External links
 
 

1950 animated films
1950 short films
1950s English-language films
Donald Duck short films
1950s Disney animated short films
Films directed by Jack Hannah
Films produced by Walt Disney
Films set in the 1890s
American animated short films
RKO Pictures short films
RKO Pictures animated short films
Films about ducks
Films about rodents
Animated films about mammals
Chip 'n' Dale films
Films scored by Oliver Wallace